The 1916 Navy Midshipmen football team represented the United States Naval Academy during the 1916 college football season. In their second season under head coach Jonas Ingram, the Midshipmen compiled a  record and outscored their opponents by a combined score 

The annual Army–Navy Game was played on November 25 at the Polo Grounds in New York City; Army

Schedule

References

Navy
Navy Midshipmen football seasons
Navy Midshipmen football